Gelati Cecchi is an Italian gelato company founded in 1936 by Gabriello Cecchi in Turin. Today the company is led by grandson Stefano Cecchi.

History

1936-1950
In 1936, Gabriello Cecchi moved to Turin. He was originally from Ponte Buggianese, in Tuscany, but he hailed from France, where he learned the art of making gelato from Italian immigrants. Assisted by his wife and his brother, Tancredi, he opened an gelato parlour in Corso Palestro with a seating capacity of 200 and a workshop attached. The business grew quickly, thanks also to his famous crema gialla custard flavour, considered the best in Turin at the time. This particular type of vanilla, a flavour that no one ever managed to reproduce, was Gabriello's jewel in the crown. The glass sign featuring golden italics on an aquamarine background, which dominated the Corso Palestro parlour's shop window – Cecchi Gelati Naturali – revealed only part of the secret. Gabriello did use top quality ingredients, but it was the formula he used to mix those ingredients that made his gelati so unforgettable. It was a time when gelato was booming; it became a mass consumer good in the postwar years. Gelato recipes were perfected and new ways of eating it were invented. The usual steel cups used for serving it at tables were joined by wafer cones for eating it while strolling along. The three most important brands in Turin were Cecchi, Fiorio and Pepino. Then there were those who didn't have a shop yet and toured the city on a bicycle cart, such as Teofilo Sanson, who sold the gelato his close friend Gabriello had provided him.

1950-1960
At the end of the Second World War – during which Gabriello fought alongside the partisans (he was the commander of the 77th Garibaldi Brigade in Italy and the Third International Brigade in Spain) – Gelati Cecchi made a giant leap towards industrialisation. The gelato parlour in Corso Palestro was no longer big enough for its ambitious founder, who was in no doubt as to the quality of his products and wished to distribute them beyond the borders of Turin. New machines and technologies became available, hence the first production plant in Via Abate Chanoux was set up: an establishment that initially employed 40 people. Gelati Cecchi produced gelato lollies, cones, sandwiches and tubs. The workshop boasted modern pasteurising and freezing equipment supplied by Cecchi's friends, Bruto and Poerio Carpigiani. A sales network of entrepreneurs was set up, selling and delivering gelato throughout the regions of Piedmont and Liguria. The increase in production was supported by Cecchi's first simple promotional efforts.

1960-1973
In the Sixties, Gabriello Cecchi streamlined the company's structure and focused on industry. He opened a new, modern, 3,000-metre production plant in Vinovo. His son Raimondo, fresh out of law school, was now helping him. Gelati Cecchi grew till it employed 300 members of staff and boasted a network of 120 agents who supplied as many as 1,500 points of sale, expanding to cover the whole of northern Italy and part of the French Riviera. The brand was now a market leader and its marketing efforts attempted to find an image that would be more recognizable and up-to-date. This was how Cecchino, the cartoon that helped enliven the company's message, came about. Cecchino decorated the fridges and enamel boards displayed at the entrance to the shops the company supplied and, next to him, customers found the gelati that had now been given their own special names: Capriccio, Canestrino, Secchiello, Mattonella, Graziella, Nobilino, Parigina, Canguro and Mela Cha Cha Cha. The company's communication strategy could not fail to feature sport and Gelati Cecchi linked its name to Pallacanestro Biella, which competed in the A1 league and boasted talented players of the calibre of Rudy Bennett and Charlie Caglieris. The company once founded by Gabriello – who by now had been made a Cavaliere del Lavoro (a knight of the Italian Order of Merit for Labour) – had thus become one of the ten biggest Italian gelato companies and joined Motta, Alemagna, Besana, Algida, Chiavacci, Sammontana, Toseroni, Sanson and Tanara in setting up a trade association that was presided over by Raimondo Cecchi for a two-year stint. At the height of its success in the early 1970s and during a general phase of corporate take-overs, Gelati Cecchi was acquired by the Barilla Group through its subsidiary, Tanara, only to become part of the  SME Group, alongside Motta and Alemagna.

1973-1993
Gabriello Cecchi became manager of the Italgel Group dealing with research and development. At the beginning of the 1980s a new brand was founded in gourmet cuisine which immediately met with the public's approval: Antica Gelateria del Corso. The Knight has followed the development of the project step by step bringing forth unforgettable products such as the ice cream coconut, the gelato lemon and the famous tartufo (truffle).

In 1993, the Italgel group was sold for 475 billion lire to the Swiss multinational food corporation, Nestlé. The Cecchi family bowed out from the world of gelato forever, except for Silvano Moschini, the brother of the Knight's wife, Luisa Cecchi, who kept the family tradition alive in his traditional gelato parlour in Via Nizza. And it's thanks to Silvano that the secret of traditional gelato has reached us today; a secret that has brought him international honour and Italian recognition in the Gambero Rosso and Slow Food guides.

2014
Stefano Gabriello Cecchi – Raimondo's son and Gabriello's grandson, the founder of a record company, a creator of luxury brands and a global marketing and communication consultant – decides to revive Gelati Cecchi using his grandfather's formulas.

References

Ice cream brands
Dairy products companies of Italy
Manufacturing companies based in Turin